is a Japanese professional shogi player ranked 8-dan.

Early life
Urano was born in Osaka Prefecture on March 14, 1964. In October 1977, he was accepted into entered the Japan Shogi Association's apprentice school at the rank of 6-kyū under the tutelage of shogi professional . He was promoted to 1-dan in 1990 and obtained full professional status and the rank of 4-dan in October 1983.

Shogi professional
Urano won his 400th game as a professional in February 2005.

In March 2017, Urano voluntarily declared himself as a free class player, thus leaving the Meijin tournament league. During the 75th Meijin Class C2 League season (April 2016March 2017), Urano lost all ten of his games and received a demotion point as a result. This was a continuation of a series of poor results in Meijin Class League play73rd Meijin Class C1 (1 win and 9 losses) and 74th Meijin Class C1 (2 wins and 8 losses)and rather than risk automatic demotion to free class play, Urano decided to do so of his own accord.

Promotion history
The promotion history for Urano is as follows:
 6-kyū: 1977
 1-dan: 1980
 4-dan: October 19, 1983
 5-dan: April 1, 1987
 6-dan: April 1, 1989
 7-dan: April 1, 1996
 8-dan: September 14, 2012

Awards and honors
In 2008, Urano received the Japan Shogi Association's "25 Years Service Award" for being an active professional for twenty-five years.

References

External links
 Japan Shogi Association official profile page 
 ShogiHub: Urano, Masahiko
 

Japanese shogi players
Living people
Professional shogi players
Professional shogi players from Osaka Prefecture
1964 births